Route 171 is a regional east-west road in southern Israel. It is the only east-west road in the Negev Mountains. It is 33 km long. It goes from Mount Harif junction on Highway 10 adjacent to Israel's border with Egypt to HaRuhot junction with Highway 40 about 5 km north of Mitzpe Ramon. In its eastern portion it crosses HaRuhot Plain and passes by the Mitzpe Ramon Airport.

Junctions

 
This is a group of 17 water cisterns spread over an area of 2 square km, that were dug during the reign of Solomon in the 10th century BCE. 15 of the water-pits are still filled with water in the winter rainy season.

See also
List of highways in Israel

171